Falsomesosella annamensis is a species of beetle in the family Cerambycidae, described by Stephan von Breuning in 1939.

References

annamensis
Beetles described in 1939